Henik Luiz de Andrade or simply Henik (ヘニキ, Heniki, born 8 September 1989 in Astorga, Paraná), is a Brazilian footballer who play as a Defensive midfielder or Centre-back and currently play for Tochigi City FC.

Career
On 7 March 2023, Henik announcement officially transfer to Kanto club, Tochigi City FC for ahead of 2023 season.

Career statistics

Club
Updated to the 10 March 2023.

References

External links

Profile at FC Gifu 
Profile at Tochigi SC 

1989 births
Living people
Brazilian footballers
Criciúma Esporte Clube players
Villa Nova Atlético Clube players
ABC Futebol Clube players
Botafogo Futebol Clube (PB) players
FC Gifu players
Tochigi SC players
Renofa Yamaguchi FC players
Tochigi City FC players
Campeonato Brasileiro Série A players
Campeonato Brasileiro Série B players
Campeonato Brasileiro Série C players
J2 League players
J3 League players
Brazilian expatriate footballers
Association football midfielders
Expatriate footballers in Japan
Brazilian expatriate sportspeople in Japan